The World DanceSport Federation (WDSF), formerly the International DanceSport Federation (IDSF), is the international governing body of DanceSport and Para DanceSport, as recognised by the International Olympic Committee (IOC) and the International Paralympic Committee (IPC).

Founded in 1957 as the International Council of Amateur Dancers (ICAD), it took the name IDSF in 1990. In 2011, it was renamed to WDSF to emphasise the global character of the organization.

Presidents

History 
 1909 First unofficial ballroom championships in Paris
 1957 ICAD founded in Wiesbaden on 12 May 1957
 1960 First television broadcast of Dancesport
 1990 Name changed to IDSF
 1992 Becomes a member of the General Association of International Sports Federations (GAISF)
 1995 World Rock & Roll Confederation (WRRC) joins IDSF as an associate member
 1997 Recognised by the IOC
 2001 Subscribes to World Anti-Doping Code
 2004 International Dance Organisation (IDO) joins IDSF as an associate member
 2007 Presentation of the VISION 2012 project to the IDSF General Meeting
 2008 IDSF and the International Paralympic Committee "enter into a collaboration agreement to promote Wheelchair DanceSport jointly"
 2008 United Country and Western Dance Council (UCWDC) joins IDSF as an associate member
 2008 IDSF General Meeting delegates the praesidium to pursue a restructure of the federation under VISION 2012
 2010 Launches the IDSF Professional Division
 2011 Changes name to WDSF on 19 June

Members 
The WDSF has 95 national member associations, 71 of which are recognised by their National Olympic Committee.

77 of them are full members while 18 are provisional members.

Full members

Provisional members

Associate members

Sport directors

Membership in other organisations 

 Global Association of International Sports Federations (GAISF; formerly SportAccord)
 International World Games Association (IWGA)
 Association of IOC Recognised International Sports Federations (ARISF)
 International Masters Games Association (IMGA)

Relationship with the World Dance Council 

The WDSF is not the only international organisation in the field of competitive dance: the World Dance Council (WDC) is another prominent international dance organisation.

In the past, the WDC focus was on administering professional dancers and competitions. However, the launch of the WDC Amateur League in 2007 put the two organisations in direct conflict. The launch of the IDSF Professional Division in 2010 has since become an additional point of conflict.

The WDSF formerly prohibited its members from participating in any competition that is not listed and registered by either WDSF or a WDSF National Member Body. WDC competitions fall into this prohibited category. This policy was revoked in 2012 at the Annual Meeting by vote of the members and since then WDSF encourages athletes to support only WDSF DanceSport and imposes certain restrictions on athletes who compete outside the WDSF DanceSport system.

Like the WDC, WDSF bans same-sex couples from entering competitions, under rule D2.1.1, which states a couple must consist of a man and a woman.

Publications 
The International News (Tanzsportmagazin), which served as WDSF's official publication since 1998, was replaced in 2004 by DanceSport Today, and in 2009 by World DanceSport magazine.

Latin World champions - Adult

Latin European champions - Adult

Standard World champions - Adult

Standard European champions - Adult

10 dance World champions - Adult

10 dance European champions - Adult

World Games - DanceSport champions - Latin

World Games - DanceSport champions - Standard

World Games - DanceSport champions - Salsa

World Games - DanceSport champions - Acrobatic rock 'n roll

World Games - DanceSport champions - Breaking B-Boy

World Games - DanceSport champions - Breaking B-Girl

Latin World champions - U21

Standard World champions - U21

10 dance world champions - U21

Standard World champions - Senior IV

Standard World champions - Senior III

Latin World champions - Senior III

Standard World champions - Senior II

Latin World champions - Senior II

10 dance World champions - Senior II

Standard World champions - Senior I

Latin World champions - Senior I

10 dance World champions - Senior I

Breaking World champions - Adult - B-Boy

Breaking world champions - Adult - B-Girl

Breaking European champions - Adult - B-Boy

Breaking European champions - Adult - B-Girl

Breaking European champions - Adult - Crew 5vs5

Hip Hop European champions - U21

Disco dance World champions - Adult solo

Disco dance World champions - Adult duo

Disco dance World champions - Youth solo

Disco dance World champions - Youth duo

Latin WDSF PD World champions

Latin WDSF PD European champions

Standard WDSF PD World champions

Standard WDSF PD European champions

10 dance WDSF PD World champions

See also 
 List of dance organizations
 SportAccord
 Association of IOC Recognised International Sports Federations
 List of DanceSport dances
 Formation dance
 Ballroom dance
 Dance basic topics
 Wheelchair DanceSport

References 

Dancesport organizations
Dancesport
Ballroom dance
International organisations based in Spain
Dance